is a Japanese actress, singer, and tarento. She was an original member of Onyanko Club. She works for the talent management firm Sony Music Artists. Her debut single, Valentine Kiss, is the most popular Valentine's Day song in Japan.

Brief biography 
Kokushō  was named after Sayuri Yoshinaga, of whom her father was a fan. After spending time living in Sasebo, Nagasaki when she was young, she attended Nishihara Elementary School and First Kanoya Junior High School, both Kanoya Municipal schools. She then attended Shimizugaoka High School in Kure, Hiroshima due to her father's transferring from JMSDF Kanoya Air Base to JMSDF Kure Naval Base while in the Japan Maritime Self-Defense Force.

While in high school, she represented the Chūgoku region in the 3rd Miss Seventeen Contest in 1984. While she didn't win the contest, she was scouted by a representative from CBS Sony (two others scouted at the same contest were Misato Watanabe and Shizuka Kudō. Kokushō later appeared on a radio show with Misato Watanabe in 1986.) She moved to Tokyo after becoming a beauty model for Shiseido and the CBS Sony representative suggested she enter the "High School Girl Special" contest on Fuji TV's All Night Fuji, where she made her television debut.

Because she was attending a high school in Hiroshima Prefecture at the time, she was described as being from Hiroshima. She was the captain of the track and field club during high school.

Onyanko Club era 
On April 1, 1985, Kokushō made her professional debut as a founding member of Onyanko Club (member #8). Because she had already graduated from high school, she was senior to most of the other members of Onyanko Club and became the de facto leader of the group. However, the "public image" leaders of the group were promoted as being Eri Nitta, Miharu Nakajima (中島美春, Nakajima Miharu), Satomi Fukunaga, and Kazuko utsumi (内海和子, Utsumi Kazuko) . Kokushō continued to stand out as a leader of the group, however, even with publicity surrounding the solo debut of fellow member Sonoko Kawai.

Kokushō then had to determine whether she wanted to continue as a member of Onyanko Club or begin a solo career and leave the group. She received some support from Nitta and Kawai, both of whom had started successful solo careers of their own. She made her solo debut on February 1, 1986 with the single Valentine Kiss, which was backed by Onyanko Club. The single reached No. 2 on the Oricon charts, No. 1 on the Music Lab and Music Research charts, and No. 4 on the music program  on TBS. The single also won the Japan Gold Disc Award for Best Single of the Year. In a 2006 survey in Japan, Oricon Style found Valentine Kiss to be the most popular Valentine's Day song. She was not, however, able to match the Oricon No. 1 position reached by Nitta and Kawai with their respective solo debut releases.

From November 2008 onwards, Kokushō has made sporadic appearances for professional wrestling promotion Oz Academy, working as the manager of the villainous Ozaki-gun alliance.

Discography

Singles

Albums

Studio albums 
  (1986)
  (1987)
 SUMMER SNOW (1988)
 Sakana (album)|SAKANA (1989)

Compilation albums 
 TRANSIT (1987)
  (1988)
  (1997)
  (2002)
  (2015)

Filmography

Film
Eureka (2000) as Yumiko
One Week Friends (2017) as Shiho Fujimiya

Television
Sukeban Deka II: The Legend of the Girl In The Iron Mask (1985) as Saori Kokobun
The Way of the Househusband (2020) as Mother (episode 9)

References

External links 
  Kokushō's official blog

Onyanko Club
1966 births
Japanese women pop singers
Japanese idols
Japanese film actresses
Japanese radio personalities
Japanese television actresses
Japanese voice actresses
Living people
Actors from Kagoshima Prefecture
People from Kanoya, Kagoshima
Professional wrestling managers and valets
Musicians from Kanagawa Prefecture
20th-century Japanese actresses
20th-century Japanese women singers
20th-century Japanese singers
21st-century Japanese actresses
21st-century Japanese women singers
21st-century Japanese singers